Polyplacotoma mediterranea is a species in the phylum Placozoa, only representative of the genus Polyplacotoma. They differ greatly from other species of placozoans with regards to their morphology and genetic makeup. P. mediterranea has the smallest mitogenome, the lowest GC content, and the smallest intergenic spacer regions of all placozoans.  Their bodily structure consists of elongated polytomous body branches, as well as a maximum size that is greater than 10 mm in length.  The mitochondrial genome of Polyplacotoma mediterranea is also very compact and contains overlapping protein and tRNA gene codes.

References

Placozoa
Monotypic animal genera
Animals described in 2019
Parazoa